Channir Chak L.C. Collegiate School is a Bangladehsi school. It is one of the oldest educational institutions in the country, established in 1935. The school is located in Koyra Upazila in Khulna District and provides education to children from classes six to eleven.

Co-education and volunteer unit
 Channir Chak L.C. Collegiate Alumni Association

References

External links
 School website

Schools in Khulna District
High schools in Bangladesh
Educational institutions of Koyra Upazila